The common puddle frog, puddle frog, or yellow bellied puddle frog (Occidozyga laevis) is a species of frog in the family Dicroglossidae. It has often been confused with Occidozyga sumatrana (which until 1998 was considered to be a junior synonym O. laevis), and records of this species outside the Philippines likely represent that species.

Range
The common puddle frog is found in peninsular Thailand (including Phuket), Malaysia, Singapore, Borneo, Anambas Islands (Tarempah), Riau Islands (Natuna Besar), and the Philippines.

Habitat
Its natural habitats are tropical moist lowland forests, rivers, intermittent rivers, swamps, intermittent freshwater marshes, coastal freshwater lagoons, arable land, pastureland, rural gardens, urban areas, water storage areas, ponds, aquaculture ponds, irrigated land, seasonally flooded agricultural land, and introduced vegetation.

References

External links
Amphibian and Reptiles of Peninsular Malaysia - Occidozyga laevis (possibly Occidozyga sumatrana)

Occidozyga
Amphibians of the Philippines
Endemic fauna of the Philippines
Taxonomy articles created by Polbot
Amphibians described in 1858
Taxa named by Albert Günther